Daspur Assembly constituency is an assembly constituency in the Paschim Medinipur district in the Indian state of West Bengal.

Overview
As per orders of the Delimitation Commission, No. 230 Daspur Assembly constituency is composed of the following: Daspur II community development block, and Basudevpur, Daspur I, Daspur II, Nandanpur I, Nandanpur II and Panchberia gram panchayats of Daspur I community development block.

Daspur Assembly constituency is part of No. 32 Ghatal (Lok Sabha constituency). It was earlier part of Panskura (Lok Sabha constituency).

Election results

2021

2016

By-election 2012
In 2012, a by-election was necessitated by the death of sitting Trinamool Congress MLA Ajit Bhunia. Mamata Bhunia of AITC defeated her nearest rival Samar Mukherjee of CPI(M) by 18,928 votes.

2011

  

.# Swing calculated on Congress+Trinamool Congress vote percentages taken together in 2006.

1977-2006
In the 2006 state assembly elections, Sunil Adhikari of CPI(M) won the Daspur assembly seat, defeating his nearest rival, Ajit Bhunia of Trinamool Congress. Ajit Bhunia of Trinamool Congress defeated Chaittaranajan Mukhopadhyay of CPI(M). in 2001. Contests in most years were multi cornered but only winners and runners are being mentioned. Chittaranjan Mukhopadhyay of CPI(M) defeated Jagannanth Goswami of Congress in 1996. Prabhas Phadikar of CPI(M) defeated Asit Bandopadhyay of Congress in 1991, Paresh Mondal of Congress in 1987, Sudhir Bera of Congress in 1982, and Bankim Chandra Sasmal of Janata Party in 1977.

1951-1972
Sudhir Chandra Bera of Congress won in 1972 and 1971. Mrigendra Bhattacharya of CPI(M) won in 1969. B.C.Sasmal of Congress won in 1967. Mrigendra Bhattacharya of CPI won in 1962. Bhabani Ranjan Panja of Congress won in 1957. In independent India's first election in 1951 the Daspur seat was won by Mrigendra Bhattacharya of CPI.

References

Assembly constituencies of West Bengal
Politics of Paschim Medinipur district